Ivanjševski Vrh (in older sources Ivanjšovski Vrh) is a dispersed village in the hills east of Radenci in northeastern Slovenia. It is in the territory of the Municipality of Gornja Radgona.

References

External links
Ivanjševski Vrh on Geopedia

Populated places in the Municipality of Gornja Radgona